Oleg Sergeyevich Dmitriyev (born 18 November 1995) is a Russian football player. He plays for FC Rodina Moscow.

Club career
He made his debut in the Russian Professional Football League for FC Oryol on 30 April 2015 in a game against FC Vityaz Podolsk.

He made his Russian Football National League debut for FC Baltika Kaliningrad on 9 August 2017 in a game against FC Yenisey Krasnoyarsk.

Dmitriyev made his Russian Premier League debut for FC Fakel Voronezh on 17 July 2022 against FC Krasnodar. Dmitriyev's contract with Fakel was terminated by mutual consent on 1 December 2022.

Career statistics

References

External links
 
 
 Profile by Russian Professional Football League
 

1995 births
People from Vyazma
Sportspeople from Smolensk Oblast
Living people
Russian footballers
Association football midfielders
FC Oryol players
FK Palanga players
FK Atlantas players
FC Baltika Kaliningrad players
FK Spartaks Jūrmala players
FC Urozhay Krasnodar players
FC Fakel Voronezh players
Russian Second League players
I Lyga players
A Lyga players
Russian First League players
Latvian Higher League players
Russian Premier League players
Russian expatriate footballers
Russian expatriate sportspeople in Lithuania
Expatriate footballers in Lithuania
Russian expatriate sportspeople in Latvia
Expatriate footballers in Latvia